List of designated Bien de Interés Cultural landmarks in the Province of Teruel''', Aragon, northeastern Spain.

Landmarks
 Teruel Cathedral
 Tower of Iglesia de San Salvador

References 

 
Teruel
Aragonese culture
Bien de Interés Cultural landmarks in Aragon